Meruserre Yaqub-Har (other spelling: Yakubher, also known as Yak-Baal) was a pharaoh of Egypt during the 17th or 16th century BCE. As he reigned during Egypt's fragmented Second Intermediate Period, it is difficult to date his reign precisely, and even the dynasty to which he belonged is uncertain.

Chronological position 

The dynasty to which Yaqub-Har belongs is debated, with Yaqub-Har being seen variously as a 14th Dynasty king, an early Hyksos ruler of the 15th Dynasty or a vassal of the Hyksos kings. Yaqub-Har is attested by no less than 27 scarab seals. Three are from Canaan, four from Egypt, one from Nubia and the remaining 19 are of unknown provenance. The wide geographic repartition of these scarabs indicate the existence of trade relations among the Nile Delta, Canaan, and Nubia during the Second Intermediate Period.

Fourteenth Dynasty 
The 14th Dynasty of Egypt was a Canaanite dynasty, which ruled the eastern Delta region just prior to the arrival of the Hyksos in Egypt. The Danish specialist Kim Ryholt has suggested that Yaqub-Har was a king of the late 14th Dynasty and the last one of this dynasty to be known from contemporary attestations. Ryholt points to a scarab seal of Yaqub-Har which was discovered during excavations in Tel Shikmona in modern-day Israel. The archaeological context of the seal was dated to the MB IIB period (Middle Bronze Age 1750 BC-1650 BC), which means that Yaqub-Har predated the 15th Dynasty. Since the name "Yaqub-Har" may have a West Semitic origin, meaning "Protected by Har", Yaqub-Har would then be a 14th Dynasty ruler. Ryholt's argument is based on the observation that while early Hyksos kings of the 15th Dynasty, such as Sakir-Har, used the title Heka-Khawaset, later Hyksos rulers adopted the traditional Egyptian royal titulary. This change happened under Khyan, who ruled as the Heka-Khawaset early in his reign, but later adopted the Egyptian prenomen Seuserenre. Later Hyksos kings, such as Apophis, abandoned the Heka-Khawaset title and retained instead the customary Egyptian prenomen, just like the kings of the 14th Dynasty. Ryholt then notes that Yaqub-Har himself always used a prenomen, Meruserre, which suggests that he either ruled at the end of the 15th Dynasty or was a member of the Asiatic 14th Dynasty. Since the end of the 15th Dynasty is known not to have included a ruler by the name of Meruserre, Ryholt concludes that Yaqub-Har was a 14th Dynasty ruler.

Fifteenth Dynasty 
On the other hand, Daphna Ben-Tor and Suzanne Allen note that Yaqub-Har's scarab seals are stylistically almost identical with those of the well-attested Hyksos king Khyan. This suggests that Yaqub-Har was either Khyan's immediate 15th Dynasty successor or a vassal of the Hyksos king who ruled a part of the Egyptian Delta under Khyan's authority. As Ben-Tor writes, "Supporting evidence for the Fifteenth Dynasty affiliation of King Yaqubhar is provided by the close stylistic similarity between his scarabs and the scarabs of King Khayan". Additionally, the form of the wsr-sign used in these kings' royal prenomina "argue for a chronological proximity [between Yaqub-Har and Khyan] and against Ryholt's assigning of Yaqub-Har to the Fourteenth Dynasty and Khayan to the Fifteenth Dynasty."

Popular speculation
In Exodus Decoded, filmmaker Simcha Jacobovici suggested that Yaqub-Har was the Patriarch Jacob, on the basis of a signet ring found in the Hyksos capital Avaris that read "Yakov/Yakub" (from Yaqub-her), similar to the Hebrew name of the Biblical patriarch Jacob (Ya'aqov).  Jacobovici ignores the fact that Yaqub-Har is a well-attested pharaoh of the Second Intermediate Period; and Yakov and its variants are common Semitic names from the period. Furthermore, Jacobovici provides no explanation as to why Joseph would have a signet ring with the name of his father Jacob.

References

External links
14th Dynasty

17th-century BC Pharaohs
16th-century BC Pharaohs
Pharaohs of the Fourteenth Dynasty of Egypt
Pharaohs of the Fifteenth Dynasty of Egypt